Rafael Cordero may refer to:

Rafael "Churumba" Cordero Santiago (1942–2004), former mayor of Ponce, Puerto Rico
Rafael Cordero (educator) (1790–1868), known as "The Father of Public Education in Puerto Rico"